Əxşam (also, Akhsham and Ekhshem) is a village in the Yevlakh Rayon of Azerbaijan. The village forms part of the municipality of Havarlı.

References 

Populated places in Yevlakh District